Barbie and the Magic of Pegasus is a 2005 computer-animated adventure film directed by Greg Richardson and produced by Mattel Entertainment with Mainframe Entertainment. It first premiered on Nickelodeon on September 18, 2005, and it was released later to DVD on September 20, 2005.

The sixth entry in the Barbie film series, it is the second to feature an original story not based on previous material and the only film to be released in 3D. It follows the story of Princess Annika, who has to save her parents after an evil wizard named Wenlock turns them to stone. Kelly Sheridan reprised her role for Barbie's character and Brie Larson recorded a song titled "Hope Has Wings" for the film.

Official description 
"Barbie takes flight in her first original princess fairy tale movie, Barbie and the Magic of Pegasus. Princess Annika discovers adventure when she is befriended by Brietta – a magnificent, winged horse – that flies her to the beautiful Cloud Kingdom. Annika has only three days to break the spell of Wenlock, an evil wizard who has turned her family to stone.

On her quest to defeat Wenlock, Annika meets new friends and together they travel to forbidden forests, skate through icy caverns and fly above the clouds as they attempt to build a magical wand of light."

Plot
On her birthday, Princess Annika (played by Barbie) worries her parents by going outside to ice skate without permission and bringing home a "possibly dangerous" polar bear cub named Shiver. As a result, the overprotective King and Queen forbid her from going skating ever again.

Annoyed, Annika sneaks out to join a skating festival in the village that night. A powerful sorcerer named Wenlock appears and orders the princess to marry him. The King and Queen arrive and confront Wenlock, but he laughs and cryptically reminds the king and queen of the fate of their "other daughter". When Annika refuses his proposal, Wenlock petrifies the entire village population, including Annika's parents. Annika is rescued by a winged horse named Brietta (played by Summer), but Wenlock warns her she has three days to marry him; otherwise, the spell will become permanent.

Brietta takes Annika to the Cloud Kingdom, ruled by Queen Rayla (played by Christie). Annika discovers that her parents' "other daughter" is, in fact, Brietta, who was transformed into a pegasus by Wenlock when she refused to marry him. This explains why their parents were so protective of Annika once she was born. The Cloud Queen tells Annika that the only thing that can defeat Wenlock is a "Wand of Light"; built from a measure of courage, a ring of love, and a gem of ice lit by hope's eternal flame. Despite Brietta's reluctance due to past failed attempts, Annika assures her that they can build the wand together.

Annika, Brietta, and Shiver travel to the Forbidden Forest, where they meet Aidan (played by Ken), a blacksmith. When Shiver falls into a giant's stew pot, Annika uses her hair ribbon to help them escape. The ribbon, Annika's exact height, is the "measure of courage", and turns into a staff for the Wand of Light. After getting a map from the gem dealer Ferris, the group finds a large cavern filled with ice gems, where Annika and Aidan take one each. Aidan reveals that he ran away from his parents after he lost all of their money gambling. He took an extra gem to bring to his parents, so they would forgive him. Brietta offers her tiara for the ring of love. With all three objects, Aidan smiths the "Wand of Light", and Annika uses it to transform Brietta back into a human.

On their way back to the Cloud Kingdom, Annika and Brietta are pursued by Wenlock, and Brietta is knocked unconscious in the chase. Enraged, Annika orders the wand to destroy Wenlock, but it doesn't work. With no other options, she gives in and finally agrees to marry him. Wenlock refuses, calling her annoying, just like his former wives, all now cursed to become trolls. He takes the wand and buries Annika in an avalanche.

Aidan helps dig Annika out. After she recuperates, the group sneaks into Wenlock's palace. Annika finds the wand, but it has been damaged and the gem breaks off and falls into the sea.  Aidan offers his gem as a replacement; realizing that the wand cannot be used for vengeance, Annika breaks all of Wenlock's spells for the love of her family and her people. Wenlock is stripped of his powers, his ex-wives are restored to their true forms, and the spell on Annika's kingdom is broken. Annika and Brietta are reunited with their parents, while Aidan reconciles with his father. In the Cloud Kingdom, Annika and Aidan skate together, while the Cloud Queen lifts the wand into the sky to become a star.

Characters
 Barbie as Princess Annika – A strong-headed princess who loves ice skating. She often wears light purple dresses. Initially, Annika does not understand why her parents are so overprotective of her, but after learning of Brietta's backstory, she realizes she was wrong and decides to set things right.
 Summer as Princess Brietta – Annika's older sister who was transformed into a pegasus by Wenlock on her birthday when she refused to marry him. Her dress is always pink. When Brietta is still a pegasus, she can see her human appearance when she sees herself in the mirror.
 Wenlock – A powerful sorcerer and the main antagonist. He has married three times, though he's turned his previous wives into trolls to act as his servants. When he looks for the prettiest girl to wed, he finds Annika is the right person for him. He rides a griffin.
 Ken as Aidan – A blacksmith. He had received money from his parents, but he lost all of it in a game. In shame, he hides in the deepest part of the Forbidden Forest before he meets Annika. Annika's plight enlightens his spirit, where he decides to help Annika create the Wand of Light and save her people.
 Shiver – A polar bear who makes an acquaintance with Annika during her ice skating. She also has a liking for anything sparkly.
 Christie as Rayla, the Cloud Queen – The ruler of the Cloud Kingdom, where Brietta hid herself after Wenlock turned her into a pegasus. 
 Kelly and Chelsie as Rose, Blush, and Lilac – Three little girls who make colors in the clouds every dawn and dusk. Rose makes the clouds pink, Blush makes the clouds yellow and Lilac makes the clouds purple. They are Brietta's friends.
 Ollie – A barefoot, green giant that almost makes a stew out of Annika and Shiver.
 Ferris – A shady and greedy thief who runs a trading business. He's an old acquaintance of Aidan, and he gives Annika and Aidan a map that will supposedly help them find a gem to complete the Wand of Light. Later on, he's transformed into a doormat by Wenlock after informing him of Annika and Aidan's whereabouts. It's never seen if he's freed from Wenlock's spell or not.

Voice cast

Music 
Brie Larson performed the theme song for the film, entitled "Hope Has Wings". Composed by Arnie Roth, the orchestral music is from Haydn's Symphony No. 94 "Surprise" Grieg's Symphony No. 1 "Morning Mood" and Beethoven's Symphony No. 6 "Pastoral".

See also 

 Barbie (media franchise)
 Barbie of Swan Lake
 Barbie in the Nutcracker
 Barbie in the 12 Dancing Princesses

References

External links
Barbie and the Magic of Pegasus at the Universal Pictures Home Entertainment portal

2005 direct-to-video films
2005 films
Magic of Pegasus
2005 computer-animated films
2000s English-language films
2000s fantasy adventure films
Lionsgate animated films
Canadian animated feature films
Canadian direct-to-video films
2000s American animated films
Animated films about sisters
American direct-to-video films
American children's animated adventure films
American children's animated fantasy films
American fantasy adventure films
Canadian fantasy adventure films
Canadian animated fantasy films
Animated films about friendship
Animated films about bears
Canadian children's animated films
Films set in the Netherlands
Pegasus in popular culture
2000s Canadian films